Tomor Malasi was an Albanian politician and mayor of Tirana from 1991 through 1992.

References

Year of birth missing
Year of death missing
Mayors of Tirana